Wang Yang (born 24 September 1994) is a Slovak table tennis player of Chinese origin. He competed at the 2016 Summer Olympics in the men's singles event, in which he was eliminated in the second round by Quadri Aruna.

References

External links 
 Jang Wang at the Slovenský Olympijský Výbor 
 

1990 births
Living people
Slovak male table tennis players
Slovak people of Chinese descent
Olympic table tennis players of Slovakia
Table tennis players at the 2016 Summer Olympics
Table tennis players from Beijing
Naturalised table tennis players
Table tennis players at the 2015 European Games
Table tennis players at the 2019 European Games
European Games competitors for Slovakia
Expatriate table tennis people in Japan
Table tennis players at the 2020 Summer Olympics